The J. Harper Smith Mansion is a historic house built in 1880 for James Harper Smith (1834–1911) and located at 228 Altamont Place in Somerville of Somerset County, New Jersey. The architect Horace Trumbauer designed the library addition in 1898. The house was added to the National Register of Historic Places on December 31, 1998 for its significance in architecture from 1880 to 1911.

See also
 National Register of Historic Places listings in Somerset County, New Jersey

References

External links
 

		
Somerville, New Jersey
Houses in Somerset County, New Jersey
National Register of Historic Places in Somerset County, New Jersey
New Jersey Register of Historic Places
Houses completed in 1880